The 1980 Amílcar Cabral Cup was held in Banjul, Gambia.

Group stage

Group A

Group B

Knockout stage

Semi-finals

Fifth place match

Third place match

Walkover. Awarded 2–0 to Guinea.

Final

References
RSSSF archives

Amílcar Cabral Cup
Sport in the Gambia